The Fund for Rural America was a fund established by the 1996 farm bill (P.L. 104–127, Sec. 793) to augment existing resources for agricultural research and rural development through an annual transfer of funds from the U.S. Treasury to USDA. The Fund was notable for being the first time that mandatory money (in the form of a mandatory annual transfer to USDA from the U.S. Treasury) was provided for research programs, which traditionally receive discretionary funds as provided annually by Congressional appropriators. One-third of the fund was designated for competitive agricultural research grants, one-third for rural development projects, and one-third for either research or rural development, at the Secretary's discretion.

The 1996 farm bill (P.L. 104–127) authorized the U.S. Treasury to transfer $100 million annually to the Fund for 3 years, but a recision reduced that to $80 million. The Agricultural Research, Extension, and Education Reform Act of 1998 (P.L.105-185) extended the authority for the program through FY2003 with an annual transfer to USDA of $60 million. However, the omnibus appropriations law for FY1999 (P.L. 105–277, October 21, 1998) prohibited the expenditure of the $60 million for Fund grants and projects.

The fund was repealed in 2002 by the 2002 farm bill (P.L. 107–172, Sec. 6043).

References 

United States Department of Agriculture